Habronattus decorus is a species of jumping spider. It is found in the United States and Canada.

References

External links

 

Salticidae
Articles created by Qbugbot
Spiders described in 1846